Ray A. Parson (born May 30, 1947) is a former American football tackle in the National Football League (NFL) who played for the Detroit Lions. He played college football at University of Minnesota.

References 

1947 births
Living people
People from Uniontown, Pennsylvania
Players of American football from Pennsylvania
American football tackles
Minnesota Golden Gophers football players
Detroit Lions players